An election was held in the Australian state of Queensland on 9 September 2006 to elect the 89 members of the state's Legislative Assembly, after being announced by Premier Peter Beattie on 15 August 2006.

The election saw the incumbent Labor government led by Premier Peter Beattie defeat the National-Liberal Coalition led by Lawrence Springborg and Bruce Flegg respectively, and gain a fourth consecutive term in office. Beattie thus became the first Labor Premier of Queensland to win four consecutive elections since William Forgan Smith did so in the 1930s. Had Beattie served out his fourth term, he would have become the second-longest serving Queensland Premier, after Sir Joh Bjelke-Petersen. After the election, Springborg resigned as Opposition Leader, being replaced by Jeff Seeney.

Key dates

Results

The election result was disappointing for the Coalition. It failed to make significant gains from Labor, despite the fact that the Government had been in office for eight years and had been mired in a series of scandals in its third term. It also failed to make headway against the Independents which still held many safe rural conservative seats, winning back only Gympie. Recent instability in the Coalition, combined with a poor media performance by inexperienced Liberal leader Dr Bruce Flegg was seen as being responsible for the result. In addition, Premier Peter Beattie remained personally popular. With Labor’s huge majority largely intact, it was seen as being unlikely that the Coalition would be able to win the next election.

| colspan=7 |* The two-party preferred summary is an estimate by Antony Green using a methodology by Malcolm Mackerras.
|}

Mackerras pendulum
The following is a Mackerras pendulum for the election.

"Very safe" seats require a swing of more than 20 per cent to change, "safe" seats require a swing of between 10 and 20 per cent to change, "fairly safe" seats require a swing of between 6 and 10 per cent, while "marginal" seats require a swing of less than 6 per cent.

State of the parties before the election

Since April 2006, the ALP held 60 of the 89 seats in the Legislative Assembly, the Coalition 23 seats (16 National and seven Liberal), along with five Independents and one member of the One Nation Party. Thus to win an outright majority (45 seats), the Coalition would have needed to win an additional 22 seats from the ALP, the Independents or One Nation, assuming that they retained all of their own seats. This would have required a uniform swing against Labor of approximately 8% (such swings are very rare).

Sitting Labor member for Noosa, Cate Molloy, had resigned from the Labor Party following her disendorsement as a Labor candidate, which in turn followed her repudiation of the state government's plans to build a dam on the Mary River at Traveston. Molloy recontested the seat as an Independent.

Members who did not recontest their seats

A number of members of parliament retired at this election:

Tom Barton: Waterford, ALP
Darryl Briskey: Cleveland, ALP
Dr Lesley Clark: Barron River, ALP
Nita Cunningham: Bundaberg, ALP
Jim Fouras: Ashgrove, ALP
Don Livingstone: Ipswich West, ALP
Tony McGrady: Mount Isa, ALP
Gordon Nuttall: Sandgate, ALP
Henry Palaszczuk: Inala, ALP
Bob Quinn: Robina, Liberal
Terry Sullivan: Stafford, ALP
Marc Rowell: Hinchinbrook, Nationals

Issues 
From mid-2005, after the revelation of the Jayant Patel scandal, the issue of health has become a focus of controversy, damaging to the Beattie government.  After several inquiries and industrial disputes, a restructure of Queensland Health took place, and the state government is currently lobbying the federal government for more doctor training places in universities for Queensland.

Other issues of importance at the election included environmental management and land clearing, asbestos in state schools, the provision of transportation and infrastructure to rural and regional areas, and the management of South East Queensland's population growth.

Polling 

Labor's high levels of support was maintained until mid-2005 when support for Labor slumped and the Coalition opened a minor lead on primary votes for the first time since 1996. However, this was eventually wiped out as Labor restored a huge lead in polls in the lead up to the election and the Coalition only managed a 0.5% swing. Even though some mid-term polls suggested a swing of up to 6% against Labor, a swing of over 8% was required for Labor to lose its majority.

Campaign 
The campaign started unusually with Premier Peter Beattie denying a general election was about to be called, while residents in some Gold Coast electorates received direct mail from the ALP stating that the election had been called for September.

At a press conference on 16 August, Liberal leader Bruce Flegg stated that in the event that the Coalition won government, and the Liberal Party won more seats than the Nationals, Lawrence Springborg would still become Premier.  Other Liberal Party MPs such as Michael Caltabiano disagreed, as this ran contrary to the coalition agreement signed between the two parties, which stated that whichever party won the most seats would form government. The ALP used this to attack Coalition stability in media and advertising.

Flegg was subsequently asked to leave a shopping centre in the Redcliffe suburb of Kippa-Ring for failing to obtain permission to do a campaign walkthrough.  Flegg later denied that he had in fact been evicted.

On 22 August, Flegg took part in a media conference with Julie Bishop, federal Liberal Minister for Education, where he endorsed a Federal Government plan for the mandatory teaching of Australian history in schools.  Responding to questions from journalists, he failed to identify the date of arrival of the Second Fleet (1790), or the person after whom Brisbane was named (noted astronomer and Governor of New South Wales Sir Thomas Brisbane).

Two sad twists of fate impacted the 26-day campaign - on 30 August, opposition leader Lawrence Springborg took temporary leave from the campaign after the sudden death of his father-in-law, and National Party deputy leader Jeff Seeney and Liberal leader Bruce Flegg continued the campaign in his absence. The death of TV personality Steve Irwin ("The Crocodile Hunter") on 4 September in an accident off Port Douglas, Queensland, took the media's focus away from the election in its final week.

Current Treasurer Anna Bligh has stated the coalition's major election promises of wiping out stamp duty within five years, increasing the first home buyers grant by $3,000 and introducing a 10% per litre subsidy on ethanol-blended petrol will cost $2.4 billion and has blown the budget. Lawrence Springborg says all his election promises are costed and affordable, with costings to be released two days before the election. So far these costings have not been released.

On Friday 8 September, the day before the election, Premier Beattie and Opposition Leader Springborg participated in a "great debate" at the Brisbane Convention & Exhibition Centre, moderated by ABC journalist Chris O'Brien.

Although Newspoll and other published polls showed Labor well ahead on predicted two-party-preferred vote, Labor strategists feared that people would vote for the Coalition in a protest vote, expecting Beattie not to lose. They adopted a strategy of denying Labor was in fact ahead. The Roy Morgan poll suggested the Liberal vote had fallen, while the Greens had risen to 8%.

Seats changing hands 

¶The margins and swings in Chatsworth, Gaven and Redcliffe are relative to the by-election results.

†The margin for Noosa was notionally Labor, but sitting member Cate Molloy became an independent earlier in 2006. The post-election margin is National v. Labor.

See also
Candidates of the Queensland state election, 2006
Members of the Queensland Legislative Assembly, 2004–2006
Members of the Queensland Legislative Assembly, 2006–2009
Beattie Ministry

References

External links 
Election analysis by Antony Green of the ABC

Elections in Queensland
2006 elections in Australia
2000s in Queensland
September 2006 events in Australia